Chiara Caselli (born 22 December 1967) is an Italian actress. In 1994, Caselli won the Nastro d'Argento for Best Actress award as well as the David di Donatello for Best Actress award. Caselli has appeared in American films including My Own Private Idaho opposite River Phoenix and Keanu Reeves.

In 2002 she also appeared opposite John Malkovich in Ripley's Game.

Filmography 
 Traces of an Amorous Life (1990)
 The Secret (1990)
 My Own Private Idaho (1991)
 Especially on Sunday (1991)
 Nero  (1992)
 Sabato italiano  (1992)
 The Little Apocalypse  (1993)
 Fiorile  (1993)
 Where Are You? I'm Here  (1993)
 OcchioPinocchio (1994)
 Beyond the Clouds (1995)
 Love Story with Cramps (1995)
 Oui (1996)
 The Return of El Coyote (1998)
 The Vivero Letter  (1999)
 Olympic Garage (1999)
 Waiting for the Messiah  (2000)
 Sleepless  (2001)
 Ripley's Game  (2002)
 The Good Pope: Pope John XXIII  (2003)
 Colette, une femme libre (2004)
 BirdWatchers (2008)
 Mr. Nobody   (2008)
 The Past Is a Foreign Land   (2008)
 Father of My Children (2009)
 Like the Wind (2013)
 Presto farà giorno (2014)
 Un uccello molto seri (2014)
 Gli asteroidi (2017)
 Il signor Diavolo (2019)
 Lei mi parla ancora (2021)
 Il mostro della cripta (2021)

References

External links
 

1967 births
Italian film actresses
Living people
Nastro d'Argento winners
20th-century Italian actresses
21st-century Italian actresses